The 1920 United States presidential election in Maryland took place on November 2, 1920, as part of the 1920 United States presidential election which was held throughout all contemporary 48 states. Voters chose eight representatives, or electors to the Electoral College, who voted for president and vice president.

With its history as a slave state and substantial historic secessionist support, Maryland had been strongly Democratic during the Third Party System despite having Federalist and Whig tendencies under previous systems. However, hostility towards William Jennings Bryan’s free silver and Populist tendencies in the cities meant that the state shifted Republican in 1896 and became very close in subsequent elections during the “System of 1896”. Unlike former Confederate states and Oklahoma, Maryland did not succeed in disenfranchising its large black population despite several attempts, which helped the Republicans remain highly competitive in early twentieth-century state elections.

Woodrow Wilson had carried Maryland by 4.84 percentage points more than his national margin in 1916, which made it his best state outside the former Confederacy or West. Democratic nominee and former Ohio Governor James M. Cox did not campaign in the state, but Republican nominee and Ohio Senator Warren G. Harding, fearing that Cox might add the machine-controlled states of the Northeast to his “Solid South”, did campaign in Maryland during September. The first straw vote in mid-October showed Harding leading by around 300 votes out of 4,300, although that had reversed in a poll a week later, and at the end of October polls were divided with one giving the state to Cox but another saying that it would be safe for Harding if black women could be mustered to vote.

As it turned out, Harding carried the state comfortably: his margin was comparable to the other border states except Kentucky (where Cox was helped by Fayette County political boss Billy Kair) but Maryland was still 13.22 points more Democratic than the nation at-large or an 8 percent bigger differential than in 1916.

Results

Results by county

Counties that flipped from Democratic to Republican
Anne Arundel
Baltimore (City)
Baltimore (County)
Carroll
Dorchester
Frederick
Harford
Howard
Prince George's
St. Mary's
Washington

See also
 United States presidential elections in Maryland
 1920 United States presidential election
 1920 United States elections

Notes

References 

Maryland
1920
Presidential